Friendly Fire is a 2006 film written and directed by Sean Lennon and Michele Civetta. It accompanies Sean Lennon's 2006 album of the same name (as a DVD). The film comprises 10 music videos, one for each song on the album (with non-album tracks and dialog used during intermission scenes). Friendly Fire stars Lennon himself, playing a wide range of roles along with various friends and actors such as Bijou Phillips, Lindsay Lohan, Carrie Fisher and Jordan Galland. The project is dedicated to Lennon's late friend, Max Leroy (1975–2005).

Friendly Fire was shown publicly during the album's release in the United States at various independent screenings. Occasionally screened with Beck's album-film, The Information (which was released on the same day).

External links
 

2006 direct-to-video films
2006 films
2000s musical films
2000s English-language films
Films directed by Michele Civetta